William Lennox Bathurst, 5th Earl Bathurst (14 February 1791 – 24 February 1878), styled The Honourable William Bathurst from 1794 to 1866, was a British peer, Tory Member of Parliament and civil servant.

Bathurst was the second son of Henry Bathurst, 3rd Earl Bathurst, and his wife Lady Georgina (née Lennox). He was educated at Christ Church, Oxford, where he graduated with a Master of Arts in 1812. The same year, aged twenty-one, he was elected to the House of Commons as one of two representatives for Weobley (succeeding his elder brother Lord Apsley), a seat he held until 1816. He then returned to Christ Church and graduated with a Bachelor of Arts in 1817. In 1821 he was called to the Bar, Lincoln's Inn. Bathurst was a Deputy Teller of the Exchequer between 1816 and 1830 and a Commissioner for victualling the Royal Navy between 1825 and 1829 and served as Joint Secretary to the Board of Trade from 1830 to 1847 and as Joint Clerk of the Privy Council from 1830 to 1860. In 1866, aged seventy-five, he succeeded his elder brother in the earldom and entered the House of Lords.

Lord Bathurst died in February 1878, aged eighty-seven. He never married and was succeeded in his titles by his nephew Allen.

Notes

References
 Kidd, Charles, Williamson, David (editors). Debrett's Peerage and Baronetage (1990 edition). New York: St Martin's Press, 1990,

External links

1791 births
1878 deaths
5
Members of the Parliament of the United Kingdom for English constituencies
UK MPs 1812–1818
Bathurst, E5
Members of Lincoln's Inn
Alumni of Christ Church, Oxford
William